Akysis bilustris is a species of catfish belonging to the family Akysidae (the stream catfishes), known only from two geographically proximate localities in the Xe Kong drainage, a major subdrainage of the Mekong River, in Laos and Cambodia. This species grows to a length of  SL.

Habitat and ecology 
A. bilustris occurs in streams and rivers, on sandy to muddy substrates with submerged vegetation and/or debris.

Relationship to humans 
A. bilustris is a component of local subsistence fisheries.

References

Further reading

External links 

Akysidae
Catfish of Asia
Fish of Laos
Fish of Cambodia
Fish described in 2011